The Philippine Institute of Civil Engineers or PICE is a professional organization for civil engineers in the Philippines. It was formed by merging two separate organizations of civil engineers: one group working from government sector and the second group working in the private sector.

Brief history

In the late 1920s, group of civil engineers from the government sector formed the Philippine Society of Civil Engineers (PSCE) which was the first civil engineering organization in the Philippines with Engr. Marcial Kasilag as its first president.

In 1937, the Philippine Association of Civil Engineers (PACE) was formed. This time, it was a group of civil engineers in the private sector with Engr. Enrique Sto. Tomas Cortes as its first president.

The objectives of both organizations were similar with each other in which both of them wants to: "elevate the standards of the profession, encourage research and engineering knowledge and technology, foster fellowship among members, and promote interrelation with other technological and scientific societies".

The PACE being the most active than the PSCE led to the transfer of many PSCE members to PACE. In 1950, Republic Act No. 544 (also known as the "Civil Engineering Law") was passed through the efforts of  PACE President Alberto Guevarra.

In 1972, PACE President Engr. Cesar A. Caliwara, exerted a serious effort in merging the two organization. Leaders of PACE and PSCE negotiated, and talked about the choice of name. Some concerns were raised such as formal accounting and turnover of assets and liabilities, accreditation of bonafide members and election rules for the first officers which were sooner resolved. These gave birth to the Philippine Institute of Civil Engineers Inc. and on December 11, 1973, the Securities and Exchange Commission issued a registration certificate to the association.

In February 1974, the first election of officers was held and Engr. Cesar Caliwara became its first president. In order to truly unite the civil engineers of the Philippines, provincial chapters were organized. On August 13, 1975, the Professional Regulation Commission (PRC) recognized the PICE as the only official organization of civil engineers in the Philippines.

Present time

On November 5, 2014, Philippine President Benigno Aquino III issued a declaration by virtue of Proclamation No. 904 signed by Executive Secretary Paquito N. Ochoa Jr. and has declared the month of November of every year as Civil Engineering Month to bring to the attention and consciousness of the Filipino people the importance of the civil engineers in nation building. As of year 2020, PICE has more than 91,368 registered civil engineer-members in 105 chapters and some 21,177 civil engineering student-members in 210 student chapters throughout the country. The current National President is Engr. Ador G. Canlas

Legal issues

In 2003. The United Architects of the Philippines (UAP) and PICE signed a joint resolution supporting the passage of Architecture and Civil Engineering bills delineating their respective scope of practice and to strengthen their collaborative efforts in common goals.

The two professional groups through their leaders stressed the need for the immediate passage of their respective bills, which would benefit their hundreds of thousand members nationwide.

In 2004, the Architecture Act was passed and signed into law. But in 2005, a petition for declaratory relief filed on May 3, 2005, by the PICE and Engr. Leo Cleto Gamolo to declare null and void Sections 302.3 and 302.4 of the Revised Implementing Rules and Regulations (“Revised IRR”) of Presidential Decree No. 1096 (the “National Building Code”). The said provisions require that architectural documents submitted in applications for building permits must be prepared, signed and sealed by architects. PICE claim that the said sections of the Revised IRR, by effectively prohibiting Civil Engineers from also preparing, signing and sealing architectural documents, are contrary to the National Building Code and the Republic Act No. 544 (the “Civil Engineering Law”), which purportedly gave Civil Engineers the said right.
After several court hearings at the Manila Regional Trial Court, the PICE's motion was denied and the RTC ruled in favor of the architects. This issue was brought by the PICE to the Court of Appeals.

On January 5, 2012, the Court of Appeals, in its decision granted the appeal of PICE and reversed the Decision of the Regional Trial Court thus giving the Civil Engineers the rights from preparing, signing and sealing architectural documents

Chapters

Regular chapter

The general membership of the institute, except for the honorary and student members, was organized into autonomous chapters composed of members residing or having principal sites of business in the area to be served by the chapter. The regular chapters are formed for the purpose of:

 Fostering closer association among members in an area or locality;
 Encouraging the members to prepare and discuss papers on the study of civil engineering problems in that area or locality; and
 Encouraging the cooperation with other allied engineering, technical or scientific groups in the area or locality in matters of common interest.

Student chapter

The institute supports the formation of student chapters in engineering Institutions in order to:

 Encourage civil engineering students to work together in fellowship and dedication to Science and Technology;
 Enhance and improve civil engineering standards, curricula and facilities in schools;
 Provide encouragement, guidance and leadership to civil engineering students; and
 Promote association of civil engineering students with the members of the civil engineering profession.

The regular chapters are tasked to supervise all student chapters organized in their areas and aid them in their undertakings.

International chapter

Upon the approval of the Securities and Exchange Commission (SEC) to the amended By-laws (November 25, 1999), the formation of international chapters was made possible. The chapters, which are based on other countries, is a manifestation of the institute's commitment to reach-out to Filipino civil engineers around the world and to establish a more concrete point of union for Filipino civil engineers.

 PICE -Eastern Province 
 PICE -Riyadh Region Chapter
 PICE  Chapter 
 PICE  Chapter
 PICE  Chapter
 PICE  Chapter 
 PICE  Chapter
 PICE -Western Region 
 PICE  Chapter
 PICE  Chapter
 PICE  Chapter
 PICE  Chapter
 PICE  Chapter

Affiliate societies

 Association of Structural Engineers of the Philippines (ASEP)
 Association of Accredited Consultant CE of the Philippines (AACCEP)
 Association of Civil Engineering Educators of the Philippines (ACEEP)
 City and Municipal Engineers Association of the Philippines (CMEAP)
 District Engineers League of the Philippines (DELP)
 Philippine Association of Building Officials (PABO)
 Provincial Engineers Association of the Philippines (PEAP)
 Road Engineering Association of the Philippines (REAP)
Philippine Accredited Materials Engineers Association (PAMEA)
Filipino Planning Engineers Association (FPEA)
Structural Engineers Association of Davao (SEAD)

Notable members

 Fidel V. Ramos - Honorary member - popularly known as FVR, was the 12th President of the Philippines from 1992 to 1998. He graduated from the United States Military Academy with Bachelor of Science in Military Engineering. He also graduated in University of Illinois with master's degree in civil engineering.
 Angel R. Lazaro Jr. - Past President (1968) - he topped the CE board examination in 1938 and also topped the board examination for Architects in 1958.  He is well known for the restoration of seven (7) 400-year-old national heritage churches located in various parts of the Philippines, rural and public markets either privately or government owned, urban health and nutrition projects of the Department of Health.
 Angel A. Lazaro, III - Past President (1983) - He is the receiver of Certificates of Recognition as Structural Engineer and Civil Engineering Educator from the Board of Civil Engineering. He was acknowledged as the Most Outstanding Civil Engineer Award from the Professional Regulation Commission in 1994.  He is also Past President of the Confederation of Filipino Consulting Organizations (COFILCO), National Society for Seismology and Earthquake Engineering of the Philippines (NSSEEP), Philippine Federation of Professional Associations (PFPA), Road Engineering Association of the Philippines (REAP), Philippine Association for Technological Education (PATE), American Concrete Institute, Philippine Chapter (ACI-RP) and Council of Filipino Consultants (COFIC)
 David M. Consunji - Past President (1989–1990) - he is the Chairman of publicly listed holding firm, DMCI Holdings, Incorporated. A former Secretary of the Department of Public Works, Transportation and Communications. In 2010, Forbes listed him as the 12th richest Filipino with a net worth of US$715 million.
 Felipe F. Cruz - Past President (1997–1998) - he is a TOFIL Awardee for General Construction in 2007. His notable projects are some of the country's most efficient industrial plants, such as: the Tongonan 1, 2, & 3 Geothermal Power Plant in Leyte, the San Roque Hydroelectric Plant in Pangasinan, and the Tiwi 1&2 Geothermal Power Plant in Albay

References

Professional associations based in the Philippines
Civil engineering professional associations